Michael Chang defeated Andrei Chesnokov in the final, 6–3, 6–4, 7–5 to win the men's singles tennis title at the 1992 Indian Wells Masters.

Jim Courier was the defending champion, but lost to Andrei Chesnokov in the third round.

Seeds
The top eight seeds receive a bye into the second round.

Draw

Finals

Top half

Section 1

Section 2

Bottom half

Section 3

Section 4

External links
 ATP main draw

Newsweek Champions Cup - Singles